Francis Egerton may refer to:

Francis Egerton (Royal Navy officer) (1824–1895), British admiral and MP for Derbyshire East and for Derbyshire North-East
Frank Egerton (Francis David Egerton, born 1959), British novelist

Peers 
Francis Egerton, 3rd Duke of Bridgewater (1736–1803), peer and originator of British inland navigation
Francis Egerton, 8th Earl of Bridgewater (1756–1829), British eccentric, and supporter of natural theology
Francis Egerton, 1st Earl of Ellesmere (1800–1857), British Chief Secretary for Ireland and Secretary at War, MP for Bletchingley, Sutherland and for South Lancashire
Francis Egerton, 3rd Earl of Ellesmere (1847–1914), British author and soldier
Francis Egerton, 7th Duke of Sutherland (born 1940), British peer and landowner